Hemisquilla australiensis is a species of mantis shrimp native to South America.

Conservation
H. braziliensis is currently facing pressure in the South Atlantic due to bycatch and exploitation. Off the coast of the Brazilian states of Sao Paulo and Rio de Janeiro, commercial pink shrimp trawling is common and often leads to the bycatch and discarding of numerous species of crustaceans, including H. braziliensis. Due to its large size, the species is also directly targeted for commercial exploitation in this region.

References

Stomatopoda
Crustaceans of South America